The Phantoms is a 2012 Canadian film, produced by Dream Street Pictures, based on the true story of the 2008 Boys in Red bus crash in Bathurst, New Brunswick. The film aired on CBC Television on November 18, 2012.

Reception
Family members of some of the victims were critical of the film.

Awards
In 2013 it narrowly defeated Animism: The Gods' Lake in the 13–17 category of the Shaw Rocket Fund's RocketPrize. In 2014 The Phantoms won an International Emmy Kids Award for Best Kids TV Movie/Mini-Series.

References

External links
 
 

2012 television films
2012 films
CBC Television original films
Films shot in New Brunswick
English-language Canadian films
Canadian drama television films
2010s Canadian films